Petersgaard is a Neoclassical manor house and agricultural estate located between Kalvehave and Vordingborg in Vordingborg Municipality, on the southern part of Zealand, in southeastern Denmark. The Neoclassical main building overlooks Ulvsund and the Queen Alexandrine Bridge, with the island of Møn in the background.

History

Peter Johansen's estate and dockyard
Petersgaard is one of 12 estates that were created when Vordingborg Cavalry District was sold at auction in 1774. Kallehavegaard was as Estate No. 12 sold to the merchant and shipowner Peter Johansen. He renamed it Petersgaard. Born in Stavreby at Jungshoved, Johansen was the son of a poor immigrant farmer from Poland (Johan Klabovsky). He fled from the Stavnsbånd and was able to buy his freedom from it in 1749 for 50 rigsdaler. He had by then worked his way up to becoming a wealthy merchant and ship-owner in Copenhagen. From 1776 to 1780, he constructed a new main building on his estate as well as a three-winged, thatched home farm. He also established a shipyard on the coast between Langebæk and Stensby skove. It employed 80 workers. It proved difficult to attract properly trained ship builders from Copenhagen and bureaucracy made it difficult to get goods and materials down to the shipyard on time. Only a few ships were therefore launched from the shipyard. Johansen planted an oak forest on some of the farm land to produce his own timber for the shipyard.

Changing owners

On Johansen's death in 1798, Petersgaard was reacquired by the Crown. The Crown began the process of implementing the agricultural reforms of the time on the estate. Petersgaard, without the surrounding forests, was sold to Jacob Bentzon Resch. Times were difficult for Danish agriculture, and he had to sell the estate in 1810. The new owner was Christian Wulff, a grandson of Peter Johansen. He sold it to Michael Conrad Fabritius de Tengnagel, the occupant of the Iselinske Fideikommis, who refurbished the buildings. His widow, Nana Felicia Augusta Fabritius de Tengnagel, née Bilsted, stayed on the estate after his death in 1849 and married Hans Ditmar Frederik Feddersen in 1855. In 1864, the year after the death of her second husband, she sold Petersgaard to Peder Brønnum Scavenius. It was passed on to his son of the same name after his death in 1868.

Suhr and Juel

In 1870, Scavenius' son sold it to the wealthy merchant Ole Berendt Suhr, who had already purchased the Petersgaard forests from the state two years earlier. On his death, Petersgaard was passed to Jørgen Peter Bech, husband of Suhr's eldest daughter Caroline Charlotte Suhr, who was himself from a wealthy family of landowners. In 1885, Petersgaard was ceded to Caroline Charlotte Suhr's younger sister Ida Marie Suhr, She was part of the clientele that met at Brøndums Hotel in Skagen each year and socialized with artists such as Michael and Anna Ancher, the violinist Karen Falck and her husband Gustav Falck and Jenny Falck.

Ida Marie Suhr never married. On his death in 1949, Petersgaard passed to his son Knud Rudolf Iuel.

Architecture
The Neoclassical main building consists of two storeys above a raised cellar and has a hipped tile roof with two chimneys. The facade has a three-bay median risalit tipped by a triangular pediment.

A small, one-storey annex with thatched roof projects from the north side of the building. It is known as Little Petersgaard and dates from  1850.

List of owners
 ( –1774) The Crown
 (1774–1798) Peter Johansen
 (1798–1799) The estate of Peter Johansen
 (1799–1807) The Crown
 (1807–1810) Jacob Bentzon Resch
 (1810–1837) Christian Wulff
 (1837–1849) Michael Conrad Fabritius de Tengnagel
 (1849– ) Nanna Bilsted Fabritius de Tengnagel
 ( –1863) Hans Ditmar Frederik Feddersen
 (1863–1864) Nanna Bilsted, gift 1) de Tengnagel, 2) Feddersen
 (1864–1868) Peder Brønnum Scavenius
 (1868–1870) Peder Brønnum Scavenius II
 (1870–1875) Ole Berendt Suhr
 (1875–1886) Jørgen Peter Beck
 (1886–1938) Ida Marie Suhr
 (1938–1957) Jens Juel
 (1957–1972) Knud Rudolf Iuel
 (1972–2016) Peter Iuel
 (2016–) Anne Sophie Iuel

References

External links

 Source
 Source
 Fritz Feddersen
 Ida marie Suhr
 Ida Marie Suhr

Manor houses in Vordingborg Municipality
Listed buildings and structures in Vordingborg Municipality
Listed castles and manor houses in Denmark
Buildings and structures associated with the Suhr family
Houses completed in 1780
Neoclassical architecture in Denmark